The Assad-class corvette were originally built for Iraq during the Iran–Iraq War, by Fincantieri in Italy. Six ships were ordered in 1981. They were completed just before Operation Desert Storm, and were never delivered due to embargoes by the Italian government.

Four of the six ships were sold to the Malaysian Navy as s in 1995. The two remaining ships were laid up in La Spezia from 1990, but in 2005 it was announced they would be delivered to the New Iraqi Navy. The deal, however was later cancelled due to the condition of the ships upon inspection. On 19 May 2017, it was reported that the remaining two vessels would be delivered to the Iraq Navy after 26 years. They eventually left La Spezia on a semi-submersible carrier Eide Trader on 22 May and reached Iraq in June 2017.

The Libyan Navy operated four craft but their fate is unknown. Al Tadjier is believed to have been destroyed by US Navy aircraft. The other ships that served with the Libyan navy were Al Tougour, Al Kalij and Al Hudud. All the ships entered service between 1977 and 1979. All the remaining ships were scrapped in 1993.

Ships of the class

References

Notes

Bibliography 
Conway's All the World's Fighting Ships 1947-1995

Corvette classes
Corvettes of the Iraqi Navy
Ships built by Fincantieri
Ships built in Italy
Corvettes of the Libyan Navy